Eduardo Vernazza (13 October 1910 – 26 May 1991) was a Uruguayan artist and art critic. Vernazza was born in Montevideo, Uruguay, to parents immigrated from Genoa, Italy. He was an illustrator and art critic for the Uruguayan newspaper El Día. UNESCO chose him to be a representative of the Art Critics of Uruguay.

References

Sources

External links 
 
 CATELLS Desde 1835

1910 births
1991 deaths
20th-century Uruguayan painters
Uruguayan male artists
Male painters
20th-century Uruguayan male artists